Exequiel Albano Narese (born 8 March 1990) is an Argentine professional footballer who plays as a midfielder for Agropecuario.

Career
Narese's career got underway in 2009 with San Martín, featuring for the Argentine Primera División club once in 2008–09; which ended with relegation. After four further appearances in Primera B Nacional in two seasons, Narese was loaned out during 2011–12 to Torneo Argentino B's San Jorge. A club that signed him permanently a year later, following one goal in thirty-one fixtures as San Jorge were promoted. Guaraní Antonio Franco completed the signing of Narese on 30 June 2013. Like with San Jorge, Narese achieved promotion in his first season. He scored his first pro goal in November 2014 versus San Martín (SJ).

2016 saw Narese join Juventud Unida of Primera B Nacional, remaining with the club for two seasons whilst netting once in forty-nine fixtures in all competitions. Narese joined fellow second tier team Agropecuario on 31 July 2017, subsequently scoring five times as Agropecuario reached the promotion play-offs; where they were eliminated by his former club, San Martín.

Career statistics
.

References

External links

1990 births
Living people
Argentine footballers
Argentine expatriate footballers
Sportspeople from San Miguel de Tucumán
Association football midfielders
Argentine Primera División players
Primera Nacional players
Torneo Argentino B players
Torneo Argentino A players
San Martín de Tucumán footballers
San Jorge de Tucumán footballers
Guaraní Antonio Franco footballers
Juventud Unida de Gualeguaychú players
Club Agropecuario Argentino players
U.S.D. Città di Fasano players
Club Atlético Mitre footballers
Argentine expatriate sportspeople in Italy
Expatriate footballers in Italy